Cryptantha flava is a yellow flowered perennial plant in the borage family (Boraginaceae) found in the Colorado Plateau and Canyonlands region of the southwestern United States.

References

flava